Basileia (an Ancient Greek word meaning royal palace) may refer to:

One of the daughters of Uranus, also called Theia "Delphi Complete Works of Diodorus Siculus"
The royal palace, or citadel, of Atlantis, as described by the Greek philosopher Plato in the Critias
The Kingdom of God (basileia tou theou), or Kingdom of Heaven, in Christian theology
Basileia, Zeus's maid in the play The Birds by Aristophanes
Basileia Romaion, the Greek name for the Eastern Roman Empire, translated as Roman Empire or 'Empire of the Romans'
 Basileia Theological Journal, a theological journal published biannually by Central India Theological Seminary.
A feminine form for Basileus
An alternative spelling of Basel, Switzerland's third-most-populous city